Schneider's Bakery, Inc. is a television production company founded by Dan Schneider.

Television shows produced under the Schneider's Bakery banner are noted for using the same stable of writers on all series, something that is atypical for scripted television series and especially sitcoms that are created by the same writer; staff writers working for most of Schneider's series include Andrew Hill Newman, George Doty IV and Jake Farrow, among others. Directors Steve Hoefer and Russ Reinsel also work for the company directing many episodes under the company banner. Musicians Backhouse Mike and C.J. Abraham are largely responsible for the music on the shows. Background music selected by the crew of Schneider's Bakery includes such musicians as The Orion Experience, Jennifer McNutt, and AM.

Productions

Notes

References

2003 establishments in California
American companies established in 2003
Companies based in Los Angeles
Television production companies of the United States